Komodo Technology is a voice over Internet Protocol (VoIP) company based in the United States. It was acquired by Cisco Systems on July 25, 2000, for US$175 million in stock. It was a leading company in internet and enterprise telephone technology products, notable primarily for its introduction of the analog telephone adapter for voice over IP in the 1990s.

Komodo Technology developed VoIP telephony products and other media appliances for various telephony markets.

See also
 Sipura Technology
 Obihai Technology

References

Defunct software companies of the United States
Cisco Systems acquisitions